Shuko Aoyama and Makoto Ninomiya were the defending champions, but Aoyama chose not to participate. Ninomiya partnered Akiko Omae, and lost in the quarterfinals to Eri Hozumi and Valeria Savinykh.

Lyudmyla and Nadiia Kichenok won the title after defeating Eri Hozumi and Valeria Savinykh 6–4, 6–4 in the final.

Seeds

Draw

References
 Main Draw

Pingshan Open - Doubles
Pingshan Open